Callulops kopsteini is a species of frog in the family Microhylidae. It is endemic to Sanana Island, Indonesia. The specific name kopsteini honours Felix Kopstein, Austrian physician and naturalist who collected the type series in 1924. Common name Kopstein's callulops frog has been coined for this species.

Description
The overall appearance is stocky. The head is somewhat wider than it is long. The snout is rounded but slightly protruding. The tympanum is distinct. The finger and toe tips bear small discs; webbing is absent. Skin is smooth. The upper parts are dark brown. There are two eye spots; other markings are vague. The underside is dirty gray-brown, with diffuse, light gray spots.

Habitat and conservation
Callulops kopsteini has not been recorded after it was first collected (i.e., 1924). It presumably occurs in lowland forest. Development is assumed to be direct (i.e., there is no free-living larval stage).

This species is likely to be threatened by extensive logging taking place on Sanana Island. However, there is no recent information on its status.

References

kopsteini
Amphibians of Indonesia
Endemic fauna of Indonesia
Taxa named by Robert Mertens
Amphibians described in 1930
Taxonomy articles created by Polbot